Broken Safety 2 is the second album by American rapper 40 Cal. from Harlem, New York. It's a sequel to his debut album Broken Safety. It was originally scheduled to be released in June 2007 but was instead released on September 11 that same year via Diplomat Records and Koch Records. It features guest spots by the Dipset.

The album was originally scheduled to include a limited-edition bonus DVD featuring Dipset footage & live performances, but the release was cancelled by the distributor.

The first single was "Big Boys".

Track listing

Personnel 
 Calvin Alan Byrd – main artist, executive producer
 LaRon Louis James – featured artist (track 2)
 Durrell Mohammad – featured artist (track 4)
 Natoya Handy – featured artist (track 5)
 Gerrell Gaddis – featured artist (track 7)
 Cameron Ezike Giles – featured artist (track 13)
 Juan Rusty Brito – featured artist (track 13)
 A. Holmes – featured artist (track 15)
 Ru Spits – featured artist (track 15)
 Su Da Boss – featured artist (track 17)
 Doe Boy – producer (tracks: 1-3, 5-7, 9, 11)
 Bangaz – producer (tracks: 4, 8, 12)
 Tai Jason – producer (tracks: 14, 16)
 Shatek King – producer (track 13)
 Big-Tyme – producer (track 15)
 Skeme Team – executive producer
 Arnold Mischkulnig – mastering
 K. "Cool" Shillingford – A&R
 Seth Kushner – cover photo

Chart history

References

External links
 40 Cal. – Broken Safety 2 at Discogs

2007 albums
Sequel albums
40 Cal. albums
Diplomat Records albums